The 2017 Dow Tennis Classic was a professional tennis tournament played on indoor hard courts. It was the twenty-third edition of the tournament and part of the 2017 ITF Women's Circuit, offering a total of $100,000 in prize money. It took place in Midland, Michigan, United States, from 30 January–5 February 2017.

Singles main draw entrants

Seeds 

 1 Rankings as of 17 January 2017

Other entrants 
The following players received wildcards into the singles main draw:
  Usue Maitane Arconada
  Caroline Dolehide
  Varvara Lepchenko

The following players received entry from the qualifying draw:
  Katarzyna Kawa
  Alexandra Sanford
  Valeria Savinykh
  Katherine Sebov

The following player received entry by a lucky loser spot:
  Nicole Frenkel

Champions

Singles

 Tatjana Maria def.  Naomi Broady, 6–4, 6–7(6–8), 6–4

Doubles

 Ashley Weinhold /  Caitlin Whoriskey def.  Kayla Day /  Caroline Dolehide, 7–6(7–1), 6–3

External links 
 2017 Dow Tennis Classic at ITFtennis.com
 Official website

2017